Samia Suluhu Hassan (born 27 January 1960) is a Tanzanian politician who has been serving since 19 March 2021 as the sixth and first female president of Tanzania. She is a member of the ruling social-democrat Chama Cha Mapinduzi (CCM) party and the third female head of government of an East African Community (EAC) country. Upon the death in office of President John Magufuli, she was sworn in as president.

A native of Zanzibar, Suluhu served as a minister in the semi-autonomous region during the administration of President Amani Karume. She served as the Member of Parliament for the Makunduchi constituency from 2010 to 2015 and was the Minister of State in the Vice-President's Office for Union Affairs from 2010 to 2015. In 2014, she was elected as the vice-chairperson of the Constituent Assembly tasked with the drafting of the country's new constitution.
                                                             
Suluhu became Tanzania's first female vice-president following the 2015 general election, after being elected on the CCM ticket with President Magufuli. Suluhu and Magufuli were re-elected to a second term in 2020. She briefly served as the second female interim Head of State in the EAC – 27 years after Sylvie Kinigi of Burundi, spanning a period around the end of the year 1993.

As President, Suluhu's government enacted policies to mitigate the COVID-19 pandemic in Tanzania – in contrast to denialism under Magufuli – and made efforts towards political reconciliation with opposition parties.

Early life
Suluhu was born on 27 January 1960 in Makunduchi, an old town on Unguja island, in the Sultanate of Zanzibar.

She completed her secondary education in 1977 and began working. Subsequently, she pursued a number of short-courses on a part-time basis. In 1986, she graduated from the Institute of Development Management (present-day Mzumbe University) with an advanced diploma in public administration.

Between 1992 and 1994, she attended the University of Manchester and earned a postgraduate diploma in economics. In 2015, she obtained her MSc in Community Economic Development via a joint-programme between the Open University of Tanzania and the Southern New Hampshire University.

Political career
In 2000, she decided to run for public office. She was elected as a special seat member to the Zanzibar House of Representatives and was appointed a minister by President Amani Karume. She was the only high-ranking woman minister in the cabinet and was "looked down on" by her male colleagues because she was female. She was re-elected in 2005 and was re-appointed as a minister in another portfolio.

In 2010, she sought election to the National Assembly, standing in the parliamentary constituency of Makunduchi and winning by more than 80%. President Jakaya Kikwete appointed her as the Minister of State for Union Affairs. In 2014, she was elected as the Vice Chairperson of the Constituent Assembly tasked with drafting the country's new constitution.

In July 2015, CCM's presidential nominee John Magufuli chose her as his running mate for the 2015 election, making her the first female running mate in the party's history. On 5 November 2015, she subsequently became the first female vice-president in the history of the country upon Magufuli's victory in the election. Both Magufuli and Suluhu were re-elected for a second five-year term on 28 October 2020.

Presidency

On 17 March 2021, Mama Samia announced that Magufuli had died after a long illness; Magufuli had not been seen in public since late February. She was sworn in as his successor on 19 March 2021, and will serve the balance of Magufuli's second five-year term. The delay in the start of her term came because the Constitution of Tanzania explicitly requires the vice-president to take the presidential oath before ascending to the presidency; opposition leaders had expressed concern about a possible "vacuum" when 18 March passed without Suluhu being sworn in. Upon her swearing-in, Suluhu became Tanzania's first female president. She is also the second Zanzibari to hold the post, and the third Muslim after Ali Hassan Mwinyi and Jakaya Kikwete. She also became one of two serving female heads of state in Africa, alongside Ethiopia's Sahle-Work Zewde. Under the Constitution, since she took office with more than three years remaining in Magufuli's term, if she completes this term she will only be eligible for one full term in her own right should she decide to stand at the next election.

Suluhu's administration initiated efforts to curb the COVID-19 pandemic in Tanzania, in stark contrast to the skepticism of the virus under Magufuli's tenure. Mandatory 14-day quarantines for travellers entering Tanzania from countries housing newly risen variants of SARS-CoV-2 were imposed. Visitors were recommended to wear face masks, sanitize themselves, and practice social distancing. Suluhu permitted embassies and other international organizations to import vaccines into the country to vaccinate foreign nationals for their Tanzanian day-to-day work, aided by the Ministry of Health.

In 2022, she was named among the top 100 most influential people in the world by American magazine Time.

Political reforms and unity

President Samia inherited a politically highly divided situation in which her predecessor, Magufuli, had centralized governance towards single party politics. Upon phase 6, Suluhu's government, Mama Samia voiced desire to reverse the political direction of Tanzania. Nonetheless, shortly after Suluhu became President the leader of the opposition party CHADEMA, Freeman Mbowe, was arrested under charges of treason. All charges would later be dropped. Upon day of his release Mbowe was summoned and met with Mama Samia at the State House in Dar es Salaam. The meeting was said to be greatly successful, and has led to further meetings between the two as well as other opposition leaders to improve communication and repair the political division and create unity within the countries' political parties. On February 16, 2022, Mama Samia met with opposition leader Tundu Lissu in Belgium, where he had been living in exile after he was shot 16 times in an attempted assassination in 2017. Both spoke greatly of the conversation and for Lissu to return home to Tanzania to again participate in politics.

President Samia's meetings and reconciliations between the parties has not been universally welcomed, and has received criticism particularly within her own party. Following the release of Freeman Mbowe, and his immediate conversation with Mama Samia, his first appearance days later was at the International Women's Day event in Iringa. This caused critics to accuse Mama Samia of releasing Mbowe on condition of support for Western feminist policies.

In addition to meeting and repairing the divide between the politicians of the parties, Mama Samia has lifted restrictions of press put in place by her predecessor and reissued licenses to opposition publications. Most notably the reissue of licenses for the publications of Mwanahalisi, Mawio, Mseto, and Tanzania Daima which is owned by opposition leader Freeman Mbowe.

Infrastructure
Since taking over the presidential position in 2021, Samia has ensured that the flagship projects that were initiated by the late President Magufuli are completed on time. Besides that, she has also approved new development projects. In 2022, she attended the Expo 2020 to promote Tanzanian products and opportunities which led her to sign a business partnership deal with Dubai.

Personal life
In 1978, Suluhu married Hafidh Ameirin, an agricultural officer who, by 2014, had retired. They have four children. Her daughter Wanu Hafidh Ameir (born 1982), the couple's second child, is a special seat member of the Zanzibar House of Representatives. On 28 July 2021, COVID-19 vaccination campaign started under her charge in Tanzania, with her receiving the first dose of the vaccine and urging all Tanzanians to get their vaccines saying that the country "is not an island".

Honours and awards

Honours

Awards 

 2022: Africa Road Builders–Babacar Ndiaye Trophy

Honorary academic awards

Tanzania: The Royal Tour 
In early 2021, she filmed a movie of "The Royal Tour" with journalist and filmmaker Peter Greenberg with the intention of promoting tourism and getting different investors to invest in her country. It premiered in Los Angeles, Paramount Theatre, followed by Tanzania.

Filmography

Notes

References

External links

 Professional Newsletter Production by Samia Suluhu et al., (PDF) 2005, OUT/NSHU.
 Army supports Suluhu's military diplomacy drive, Africa Intelligence, March 17, 2023 (requires free registration)

|-

|-

|-

|-

 
1960 births
Living people
21st-century Tanzanian women politicians
Alumni of the University of Manchester
Chama Cha Mapinduzi MPs
Government ministers of Tanzania
Lumumba Secondary School alumni
Mzumbe University alumni
Open University of Tanzania alumni
Presidents of Tanzania
Southern New Hampshire University alumni
Tanzanian MPs 2010–2015
Tanzanian Muslims
Vice-presidents of Tanzania
Women government ministers of Tanzania
Women presidents
Women vice presidents
Zanzibari politicians
Female heads of state
Female heads of government
Muslim socialists